Bhakta Bahadur Shah is a Nepalese politician, belonging to the Socialist Party of Nepal. In the 2008 Constituent Assembly election he was elected from the Jajarkot-2 constituency, winning 11938 votes.

See also
 Socialist Party of Nepal

References

Living people
Communist Party of Nepal (Maoist Centre) politicians
Nepalese atheists
People from Jajarkot District
Year of birth missing (living people)
Socialist Party of Nepal politicians

Members of the 1st Nepalese Constituent Assembly